The Junk Bond Observatory (JBO; code: 701) is located in the Sonoran Desert at Sierra Vista, Arizona, United States.

It was established by amateur astronomer David Healy in his backyard in 1996, using a Celestron 14 SCT and a 16-inch Meade LX200 telescopes in a roll-off shelter. In 2000, a 20" Ritchey-Chretien was installed, to be replaced by a 32" Ritchey in 2004.

Asteroid searches began in 1998 using a local computer network and search software. The first discovery at the observatory was made by Jeff Medkeff in June 1999. It was named 38203 Sanner after Glen Sanner also a member of the Huachuca Astronomy Club.

As of November 2016, a total of  272 numbered minor planets have been discovered at the observatory, using a 32-inch telescope. The Minor Planet Center credits 219 of these discoveries to David Healy and/or Jeff Medkeff. The discovery of the remaining 53 numbered minor planets is credited directly to the observatory (see list below).

Until his death in 2011, David Healy was a frequent contributor of follow-up observations to objects on the Minor Planet Center's Near-Earth Object Confirmation Page, surveyed for asteroids netting approximately four new discoveries per month as of January 2007, performed discovery and confirmation photometry of extrasolar planet transits, and performed photometry of cataclysmic variable stars and active galactic nuclei. The telescope operated robotically, unattended for most of the night, controlled by software by Bob Denny and Jeff Medkeff.

JBO was dismantled in August 2021. The telescope, dome, and other equipment were purchased by a private buyer.

List of discovered minor planets 

The Minor Planet Center directly credits the Junk Bond Observatory with the discovery of 53 numbered minor planets during 2000–2005.

See also 
 List of asteroid-discovering observatories
 List of astronomical observatories
 
 List of observatory codes

References

External links 
  
 Junk Bond Observatory
 Spectrashift
 The NEO Confirmation Page, Minor Planet Center

Astronomical observatories in Arizona
Minor-planet discovering observatories
Sierra Vista, Arizona